Biclotymol is a phenolic antiseptic that is used for mouth and throat infections. It is also used in cough medicines.

References

Antiseptics
Phenols
Chlorobenzenes
Isopropyl compounds